Porte Dorée is a station on Line 8 of the Paris Métro.

The station opened on 5 May 1931 with the extension of the line from Richelieu–Drouot to Porte de Charenton for the Paris Colonial Exposition, held in the nearby Bois de Vincennes. It is named after the Porte Dorée, a gate in the 19th-century Thiers wall of Paris.

An interchange with Île-de-France tramway Line 3a opened on 15 December 2012.

Nearby is the Palais de la Porte Dorée, an exhibition hall built for the Paris Colonial Exposition. The Cité nationale de l'histoire de l'immigration (a museum of immigration history) and an aquarium are located in the building. The nearby Pelouse de Reuilly (part of the Bois de Vincennes) is the location of the Foire du Trône fun fair in April and May.

Station layout

References
Roland, Gérard (2003). Stations de métro. D’Abbesses à Wagram. Éditions Bonneton.

See also
 1937 Laetitia Toureaux murder

Paris Métro stations in the 12th arrondissement of Paris
Railway stations in France opened in 1931